Turner is an unincorporated community in Cypress Township, Phillips County, Arkansas, United States. The community is located at the intersection of Arkansas Highway 316 and the end of a concurrency between Arkansas Highway 1/Arkansas Highway 39. Home to the famous store and the Turner Boy Association

See also
Turner Historic District, on the National Register of Historic Places listings in Phillips County, Arkansas

References

Unincorporated communities in Phillips County, Arkansas
Unincorporated communities in Arkansas